Adrian Alin Petrache (born October 29, 1976 in Bucharest) is a Romanian rugby union administrator and former player. He is currently the president of CSM București sports club and also president of the Romanian Rugby Federation. He was also the president of the Romanian Olympic and Sports Committee between 2014 and 2016.

Petrache was a member of the Romania national team. He played three matches at the 1999 Rugby World Cup and scored a try against the United States. He played as a Number Eight.

References

External links
Alin Petrache at ecpc.org

1976 births
Living people
Rugby union players from Bucharest
Romanian rugby union players
Romanian expatriate sportspeople in France
Racing 92 players
RC Toulonnais players
Rugby union number eights
Romanian expatriate rugby union players
Romania international rugby union players
Expatriate rugby union players in France
CA Bordeaux-Bègles Gironde players
AS Béziers Hérault players
CS Dinamo București (rugby union) players
SCM Rugby Timișoara players
Presidents of the Romanian Olympic and Sports Committee
Presidents of the Romanian Rugby Federation